Relations between Bosnia and Herzegovina and the United States are described as very strong.

History

The 1992–95 war in Bosnia and Herzegovina was ended with the help of participation by the United States in brokering the 1995 Dayton Agreement. The United States maintains command of the NATO headquarters in Sarajevo. The United States has donated hundreds of millions of dollars to help with infrastructure, humanitarian aid, economic development, and military reconstruction in Bosnia and Herzegovina. The U.S. Agency for International Development (USAID) and Support for Eastern European Democracies (SEED) has played a large role in post-war Bosnia and Herzegovina, including programs in economic development and reform, democratic reform (media, elections), infrastructure development, and training programs for Bosnian professionals, among others. Additionally, there are many non-governmental organizations (NGOs) that have likewise played significant roles in the reconstruction.

According to the 2012 U.S. Global Leadership Report, 33% of Bosnia and Herzegovina's people approve of U.S. leadership, with 49% disapproving and 18% uncertain.

Diplomatic missions

The U.S. Embassy in Bosnia and Herzegovina is in Sarajevo. The current Ambassador is Michael J. Murphy.

The Embassy of Bosnia and Herzegovina in Washington, D.C. is Bosnia and Herzegovina's diplomatic mission to the United States. It is located at 2109 E Street N.W. in Washington, D.C.'s Foggy Bottom neighborhood. The embassy also operates a Consulate-General in Chicago. The current Ambassador is Bojan Vujić.

See also
Bosnian Americans
United States–Yugoslavia relations

References

Further reading
 Burt, Wayne. The Reluctant Superpower: United States' Policy in Bosnia, 1991-95 (1997) excerpt also  online review
 Hume, Susan E. "Two decades of Bosnian place-making in St. Louis, Missouri." Journal of Cultural Geography 32.1 (2015): 1-22.
 Meštrovic, Stjepan G. The Conceit of Innocence: Losing the Conscience of the West in the War against Bosnia (1997), online review
 Miller, Olivia. "Bosnian Americans." Gale Encyclopedia of Multicultural America, edited by Thomas Riggs, (3rd ed., vol. 1, Gale, 2014), pp. 331–341. online
 Puskar, Samira. Bosnian Americans of Chicagoland (Arcadia Publishing, 2007).

External links

History of Bosnia and Herzegovina - U.S. relations

 
Bilateral relations of the United States
United States